The 27th European Men's Artistic Gymnastics Championships were held from 4 May to 7 May 2006 in Volos, Greece.

Medallists

Medal standings

Overall

Seniors

Juniors

Senior results

Team competition

Floor

Pommel horse

Still rings

Vault

Parallel bars

Horizontal bar

Junior results

Team competition

The junior team competition also served as the individual all-around and qualification to the individual event finals.

Floor exercise

Pommel horse

Still rings

Vault

Parallel bars

Horizontal bar

References 

 
 
 

2006
European Men's Artistic Gymnastics Championships
2006 in European sport
International gymnastics competitions hosted by Greece
Sport in Thessaly
Events in Volos
2006 in Greek sport